Jean Baylet (6 April 1904, Valence, Tarn-et-Garonne – 29 May 1959) was a French politician. He represented the Radical Party in the Constituent Assembly elected in 1945, in the Constituent Assembly elected in 1946 and in the National Assembly from 1946 to 1958.

References

1904 births
1959 deaths
Road incident deaths in France
People from Tarn-et-Garonne
Politicians from Occitania (administrative region)
Radical Party (France) politicians
Members of the Constituent Assembly of France (1945)
Members of the Constituent Assembly of France (1946)
Deputies of the 1st National Assembly of the French Fourth Republic
Deputies of the 2nd National Assembly of the French Fourth Republic
Deputies of the 3rd National Assembly of the French Fourth Republic
French military personnel of World War II